Uruguay sent a team of 39 athletes to compete in the 2015 Summer Universiade in Gwangju, South Korea from July 3 to July 14, 2015.

Football

Uruguay has qualified a men's team in the football competition.

Each nation must submit a squad of 20 players, with a minimum of two goalkeepers. The following is the Uruguay squad in the men's football tournament of the 2015 Summer Universiade:

Coach:  Daniel Sánchez

|-----
! colspan="9" bgcolor="#B0D3FB" align="left" |
|----- bgcolor="#DFEDFD"

|-----
! colspan="9" bgcolor="#B0D3FB" align="left" |
|----- bgcolor="#DFEDFD"

|-----
! colspan="9" bgcolor="#B0D3FB" align="left" |
|----- bgcolor="#DFEDFD"

Handball

Swimming

References

2015 in Uruguayan sport
Nations at the 2015 Summer Universiade
2015